Vincent Aboubakar (born 22 January 1992) is a Cameroonian professional footballer who plays as a striker for Turkish Süper Lig club Beşiktaş and captains the Cameroon national team.

Aboubakar began his career at Coton Sport and moved to Europe in 2010, playing for Ligue 1 clubs Valenciennes and Lorient, totalling 109 appearances and 26 goals in France's top division. In 2014, he signed for Porto, where he played 125 games and scored 58 goals, winning a Primeira Liga title. He won the Turkish Süper Lig while on loan at Beşiktaş in 2017, and again in 2021.

Aboubakar has earned over 90 caps for Cameroon since his international debut in May 2010. He was part of their squads for the 2010, 2014 and 2022 FIFA World Cups, as well as the Africa Cup of Nations in 2015, 2017 and 2021. He scored the winning goal in the final of the 2017 tournament, and was the top goalscorer of the 2021 edition.

Early life
Vincent Aboubakar was born on 22 January 1992 in Garoua, North Region of Cameroon. He was raised in a devout Christian family in a Muslim-majority city and his mother Maobeal Alice was a deaconess for the Evangelical Missionary Society of Cameroon.

Club career

Valenciennes and Lorient
On 26 May 2010, Aboubakar signed with Valenciennes in France. He was assigned the number 9 shirt and made his debut in the club's opening league match of the season against Nice appearing as a substitute. He scored his first goal and hat-trick against Boulogne in Coupe de la Ligue.

Aboubakar signed for Lorient on a free transfer on 1 July 2013. He made his debut for the Breton team on 10 August, playing the full 90 minutes of a 1–0 loss at Lille, and scored his first goal eight days later, equalising in a 2–1 win over Nantes at the Stade du Moustoir. He came joint second top scorer over the season with 16 league goals from 35 appearances, including braces in a 4–0 win at Évian on 23 November and a 4–4 home draw with Montpellier on 20 April 2014.

Porto

Aboubakar signed for Porto on 24 August 2014, signing a four-year contract for a fee of €3 million, equivalent to 30% of his economic rights. He had previously been a target for Hull City.

He made his debut on 14 September in a 1–1 Primeira Liga draw at Vitoria S.C., replacing Héctor Herrera in added time. Three days later in the UEFA Champions League, after coming on for Jackson Martínez, he scored his first Porto goal to conclude a 6–0 home win over BATE Borisov in the UEFA Champions League group stage. On 25 October, again as the Colombian's replacement, he scored a first league goal to wrap up a 5–0 victory at F.C. Arouca. He was used almost exclusively as a substitute over the season, as Porto finished runners-up to S.L. Benfica.

In his second season in Portugal, following the sale of Martínez, Aboubakar played much more regularly. He opened the season on 15 August 2015 with two goals in a 3–0 win over Vitória at the Estádio do Dragão, and scored twice the following 10 January in a 5–0 win at city rivals Boavista FC. He scored once in five games as the team reached the final of the Taça de Portugal, and scored the only goal of the fifth-round win at C.D. Feirense on 16 December 2015.

Loan to Beşiktaş
On 27 August 2016, Süper Lig reigning champions Beşiktaş signed Aboubakar on a season-long loan. He made his debut for the Istanbul-based club on 10 September, replacing Olcay Şahan for the last six minutes of a 3–1 home win over Kardemir Karabükspor. He did not score until his eighth match, in which he contributed two goals to a 3–2 Champions League win at Napoli on 19 October 2016 that was his club's first win in the competition since November 2009. Four days later he scored his first league goal, also assisting Talisca in a 3–0 victory over Antalyaspor at Vodafone Park. In March 2017, he scored in each leg of a 5–2 aggregate win over Olympiakos in the last 16 of the UEFA Europa League, although he was sent off in the second game for fighting with Panagiotis Retsos. He finished the season scoring 12 goals in 27 league appearances, as the Black Eagles retained their league title.

Return to Porto
After returning to Portugal, Aboubakar was part of a three-pronged attack made of African players, alongside the Malian Moussa Marega and Algeria's Yacine Brahimi. He scored his first hat-trick for the Dragons on 20 August 2017 in a 3–0 home win over Moreirense FC. On 13 September, as the Champions League campaign began with a 3–1 home loss to Beşiktaş, he celebrated with his former teammates in their changing room. He scored five times in the group as Porto advanced, including two-goal hauls in both wins over French champions AS Monaco. On 10 December, he scored another hat-trick in a 5–0 win at Vitória F.C. that put Porto back on top of the table.

In September 2018, Aboubakar suffered an anterior cruciate ligament injury against C.D. Tondela. He underwent surgery, causing a long-term absence. On 4 May 2019, he made his comeback as a late substitute for Marega in a 4–0 home win over C.D. Aves.

On 18 August 2019, Aboubakar played the full 90 minutes of FC Porto B's 1–1 home draw with Varzim S.C. in LigaPro.

Return to Beşiktaş
After terminating his contract with Porto, Aboubakar returned to Istanbul to meet with Beşiktaş on 25 September 2020. The following day, he signed a contract until 31 May 2021. In his one season back in Istanbul, he was the fifth-highest goalscorer with 15 goals as his team won the league. This included two on 29 November in a 4–3 win at city rivals Fenerbahçe.

Al Nassr
On 8 June 2021, Aboubakar signed with Saudi Professional League club Al Nassr on a three-year deal. His salary was set at €6 million per year.

Aboubakar reached a mutual agreement to terminate his contract at the Riyadh-based club in January 2023, being compensated for what remained of it. His exit was required in order to free a foreigner quota place for Cristiano Ronaldo.

Third stint at Beşiktaş
On 21 January 2023, Aboubakar re-signed with Turkish club Beşiktaş as a replacement for departing striker Wout Weghorst. The 2-year deal involved a €1.1 million signing bonus and €1.5 million for the 2022–2023 season, and €3.1 million per season for the remaining seasons, in addition to a maximum of €12,000 euros per match depending on the duration and type of competition."

International career

On 18 August 2009, Aboubakar was called up to the Cameroon national under-20 football team for the Francophone Games in Beirut.

In May 2010, aged 18, he was named to the Cameroon 23-man squad for the 2010 FIFA World Cup. Aboubakar was the only player in the squad who was based in Cameroon. He made his debut in the friendly match on 29 May 2010 against Slovakia. On 11 August 2010, Aboubakar scored his first goal for the national team, in a friendly against Poland.

He was called up for the 2014 FIFA World Cup in Brazil, and subsequently for the 2015 Africa Cup of Nations. In the 2017 Africa Cup of Nations, Aboubakar scored an 88th-minute goal in the final to hand Cameroon a comeback 2–1 victory against Egypt to end his nation's 15-year wait for a continental crown.

Later that year, he was part of the Cameroon squad at the 2017 FIFA Confederations Cup in Russia. He scored a consolation goal in their 3–1 loss to world champions Germany in Sochi on 25 June.

Aboubakar was a noted absence from Cameroon's 2019 Africa Cup of Nations squad, with manager Clarence Seedorf doubting his fitness after his recent return from long-term injury.

Aboubakar returned to the national team for the 2021 Africa Cup of Nations, hosted by his country at the start of the following year. He scored five group stage goals against Burkina Faso, Ethiopia and Cape Verde, followed by a sixth in a 2–1 win over Comoros in the last 16. In the third-place match against Burkina Faso, he scored twice in a 3–3 draw, which was eventually won on penalties. With 8 goals in 7 games, he was the top scorer and made the Team of the Tournament.

In the 2022 FIFA World Cup, he scored a goal and provided an assist in a 3–3 draw against Serbia. His goal was described as an "outrageous scoop" by BBC Sport. He scored the winning goal against Brazil in the third match, after which he drew his second yellow card for taking off his shirt and was therefore sent off.

Career statistics

Club

International

Scores and results list Cameroon's goal tally first, score column indicates score after each Aboubakar goal.

Honours
Coton Sport
Cameroon Premiere Division: 2009–10

Beşiktaş
Süper Lig: 2016–17, 2020–21
Turkish Cup: 2020–21

Porto
Primeira Liga: 2017–18, 2019–20
Taça de Portugal: 2019–20
Supertaça Cândido de Oliveira: 2018
Cameroon
Africa Cup of Nations: 2017; third place: 2021

Individual
Africa Cup of Nations Golden Boot: 2021
Africa Cup of Nations Team of the Tournament: 2021
France Football Africa Team of the Year: 2017

References

External links

 
 

1992 births
Living people
People from Garoua
Cameroonian footballers
Association football forwards
Cameroon international footballers
Cameroon youth international footballers
Africa Cup of Nations-winning players
2010 FIFA World Cup players
2014 FIFA World Cup players
2015 Africa Cup of Nations players
2017 Africa Cup of Nations players
2017 FIFA Confederations Cup players
2021 Africa Cup of Nations players
2022 FIFA World Cup players
Coton Sport FC de Garoua players
Valenciennes FC players
FC Lorient players
FC Porto players
Beşiktaş J.K. footballers
FC Porto B players
Al Nassr FC players
Ligue 1 players
Primeira Liga players
Süper Lig players
Liga Portugal 2 players
Saudi Professional League players
Cameroonian expatriate footballers
Expatriate footballers in France
Expatriate footballers in Portugal
Expatriate footballers in Turkey
Expatriate footballers in Saudi Arabia
Cameroonian expatriate sportspeople in France
Cameroonian expatriate sportspeople in Portugal
Cameroonian expatriate sportspeople in Turkey
Cameroonian expatriate sportspeople in Saudi Arabia